Asheboro is a city in and the county seat of Randolph County, North Carolina, United States. The population was 25,012 at the 2010 census. It is part of the Greensboro–High Point metropolitan area of the Piedmont Triad and is home of the state-owned North Carolina Zoo.

History 
Asheboro was named after Samuel Ashe, the ninth governor of North Carolina (1795–1798), and became the county seat of Randolph County in 1796. It was a small village in the 1800s, with a population of less than 200 through the Civil War; its main function was housing the county courthouse, and the town was most active when court was in session. Asheboro's population only began to grow significantly following its connection to railroads: the High Point, Randleman, Asheboro and Southern Railroad first served the city in 1889, followed by the Montgomery Railroad in 1896.

Asheboro emerged as a textile production center in the 20th century with the opening of the Acme Hosiery Mills in 1909. After World War II, the city's manufacturing sector grew to include batteries, wires and food products. The city's main tourist attraction, the North Carolina Zoo, opened in 1974.

Asheboro suffered from an economic downturn in the 2000s due to a decline in its traditional manufacturing industries amid increasing competition from overseas; the national news program 60 Minutes described it as a "dying town" in 2012.

Historic buildings
The following buildings in Asheboro are listed on the National Register of Historic Places:

 Acme-McCrary Hosiery Mills
 Asheboro Hosiery Mills and Cranford Furniture Company Complex
 Central School
 Wilson Kindley Farm and Kindley Mine
 Lewis-Thornburg Farm
 Mount Shepherd Pottery Site
 Randolph County Courthouse
 Sunset Theater
 Thayer Farm Site (31RD10)

Geography
Asheboro is located at  (35.715211, -79.813001).

Asheboro is known as the center point of North Carolina. Although Asheboro is located in the gently rolling Piedmont plateau region of central North Carolina, far to the east of the Appalachian Mountains, the town and surrounding area are surprisingly hilly. The town lies within the Uwharrie Mountains, a series of ancient ridges and monadnocks which have been worn down by erosion to high hills. As such, Asheboro gives the impression of being in a more mountainous area than it actually is.

Climate

Demographics

2020 census

As of the 2020 United States census, there were 27,156 people, 10,841 households, and 6,130 families residing in the city.

2000 census
As of the census of 2000, there were 21,672 people, 8,756 households, and 5,516 families residing in the city. The population density was 1,412.5 people per square mile (545.5/km2). There were 9,515 housing units at an average density of 620.1 per square mile (239.5/km2). The racial makeup of the city was 69.45% White, 12.08% African American, 0.51% Native American, 1.39% Asian, 0.01% Pacific Islander, 7.72% from other races, and 1.80% from two or more races. Hispanic or Latino of any race were 30.9% of the population.

There were 8,756 households, out of which 30.2% had children under the age of 18 living with them, 45.9% were married couples living together, 12.5% had a female householder with no husband present, and 37.0% were non-families. 31.6% of all households were made up of individuals, and 12.8% had someone living alone who was 65 years of age or older. The average household size was 2.40 and the average family size was 3.01.

In the city, the population was spread out, with 24.1% under the age of 18, 10.5% from 18 to 24, 30.7% from 25 to 44, 19.6% from 45 to 64, and 15.1% who were 65 years of age or older. The median age was 34 years. For every 100 females, there were 95.8 males. For every 100 females age 18 and over, there were 93.1 males.

Economy

Top employers
According to Asheboro's 2021 Comprehensive Annual Financial Report, the top employers in the city were:

In October 2012 Hyosung USA announced the closure of the Asheboro wire plant and loss of 310 jobs. Built by Goodyear and acquired by Hyosung in 2011, the plant makes wires for use in car and truck tires.

Black & Decker Corp was one of the main employers in the mid 1990s; one of its products, the SnakeLight, sold millions after being introduced in late 1994. The plant employed about 1,100 workers in 1998 and was one of the three biggest employers in Randolph County.

Culture

Sports
 Asheboro is home to the Asheboro ZooKeepers of the Coastal Plain League, a collegiate summer baseball league.  The ZooKeepers play at McCrary Park in Asheboro.  The ZooKeepers began play for the 1999 season.
 Caraway Speedway, a Whelen Southern Modified Tour racing location. It is .455 mile asphalt oval that has seen famous stockcar drivers Dale Earnhardt, Richard Petty, and Kyle Petty grace its track.

Retail
Randolph Mall opened in 1982.

Transportation

Routes include U.S. Route 220 and Interstate 73/Interstate 74, which connect it to Greensboro, U.S. Route 64 bypasses most of Asheboro to the south, while it goes through more of the city limits as a separate business route. U.S. 64 also connects the city to Raleigh, and North Carolina Highway 49, which connects the city to Charlotte.

Asheboro Regional Airport serves general aviation traffic to and from the city. The closest airport with scheduled passenger service is Piedmont Triad International Airport in Greensboro.

Education
Asheboro City Schools operates public schools serving the city.

Fayetteville Street Christian School, located in Asheboro, is the largest private school in Randolph County.

In addition the Randolph County Schools has its headquarters in Asheboro.

Notable people
 Sam Ard, former NASCAR driver; 1983 and 1984 Nascar Busch Series Champion
 William Johnston Armfield, business executive and philanthropist
 Scott Bankhead, Major League Baseball and 1984 US Olympic Team pitcher 
 Chuck Bown, former NASCAR driver; 1990 Nascar Busch Series Champion
 Lane Caudell, musician and actor
 Keith Crisco, businessman and public official
 William Cicero Hammer, U.S. Congressional Representative Democrat from 1921 to 1930
 Andy Headen, former NFL linebacker for the New York Giants
 Randy Henderson, Mayor of Fort Myers, Florida from 2009-2020
 Elizabeth Lail, actress known for her role as Anna in Once Upon a Time series
 Paul Martin Newby, justice on the North Carolina Supreme Court
 Reynolds Price, novelist, essayist and educator, resident of the town in the 1930s and 1940s
 Julius Ramsay, Emmy-nominated television director and editor
 Marmaduke Swaim Robins, lawyer, private secretary to the civil war era governor, state legislator, and newspaperman. His son served as mayor of Asheboro.
 Joe Spinks, professional basketball player
 Jonathan Worth, North Carolina Governor from 1865 to 1868 during early Reconstruction

References

External links

 
 Official Visitor Info for the Greater Asheboro Area
 Asheboro/Randolph County Chamber of Commerce

 
Cities in North Carolina
County seats in North Carolina
Populated places established in 1796
Cities in Randolph County, North Carolina
1796 establishments in North Carolina